Dominic John Grehan Mahony MBE (born 26 April 1964) is a British former modern pentathlete. He competed in the 1988 Summer Olympics and at the 1992 Summer Olympics, winning a bronze medal at the 1988 Games. In 1986, he won the épée title at the British Fencing Championships.

Mahony was appointed Member of the Order of the British Empire (MBE) in the 2014 New Year Honours for voluntary services to modern pentathlon.

References

1964 births
Living people
British male modern pentathletes
Olympic modern pentathletes of Great Britain
Modern pentathletes at the 1988 Summer Olympics
Modern pentathletes at the 1992 Summer Olympics
Olympic bronze medallists for Great Britain
Olympic medalists in modern pentathlon
Members of the Order of the British Empire
Medalists at the 1988 Summer Olympics